Olivia Wright (born 12 October 1990) is an Australian diver. She won a bronze medal in the three metre synchronised springboard at the 2010 Commonwealth Games with Jaele Patrick, placing fifth in the individual 1 m springboard.

References

Living people
1990 births
Australian female divers
Commonwealth Games medallists in diving
Commonwealth Games bronze medallists for Australia
Divers at the 2010 Commonwealth Games
20th-century Australian women
21st-century Australian women
Medallists at the 2010 Commonwealth Games